Elizabeth Cary may refer to:

Elizabeth Cary, Viscountess Falkland, early modern poet and playwright
Elizabeth Cabot Agassiz (née Cary), founder of Radcliffe College
Elizabeth, Lady Amherst (née Cary), wife of Jeffery Amherst, 1st Baron Amherst

See also
Elizabeth Carey (disambiguation)